An academic journal or scholarly journal is a periodical publication in which scholarship relating to a particular academic discipline is published. Academic journals serve as permanent and transparent forums for the presentation, scrutiny, and discussion of research. They nearly universally require peer review or other scrutiny from contemporaries competent and established in their respective fields. Content typically takes the form of articles presenting original research, review articles, or book reviews. The purpose of an academic journal, according to Henry Oldenburg (the first editor of Philosophical Transactions of the Royal Society), is to give researchers a venue to "impart their knowledge to one another, and contribute what they can to the Grand design of improving natural knowledge, and perfecting all Philosophical Arts, and Sciences."

The term academic journal applies to scholarly publications in all fields; this article discusses the aspects common to all academic field journals. Scientific journals and journals of the quantitative social sciences vary in form and function from journals of the humanities and qualitative social sciences; their specific aspects are separately discussed.

The first fully peer-reviewed journal was Medical Essays and Observations (1733).

History

The idea of a published journal with the purpose of "[letting] people know what is happening in the Republic of Letters" was first conceived by François Eudes de Mézeray in 1663. A publication titled Journal littéraire général was supposed to be published to fulfill that goal, but never was. The journal's first issue was published on 5 January 1665. It was aimed at people of letters, and had four main objectives:

 review newly published major European books,
 publish the obituaries of famous people, 
 report on discoveries in arts and science, and
 report on the proceedings and censures of both secular and ecclesiastical courts, as well as those of Universities both in France and outside.

By the end of the 18th century, nearly 500 such periodicals had been published, the vast majority coming from Germany (304 periodicals), France (53), and England (34). Several of those publications, however, and in particular the German journals, tended to be short-lived (under 5 years). A.J. Meadows has estimated the proliferation of journals to reach 10,000 journals in 1950, and 71,000 in 1987. However, Michael Mabe warns that the estimates will vary depending on the definition of what exactly counts as a scholarly publication, but that the growth rate has been "remarkably consistent over time", with an average rate of 3.46% per year from 1800 to 2003.

In 1733, Medical Essays and Observations was established by the Medical Society of Edinburgh as the first fully peer-reviewed journal. Peer review was introduced as an attempt to increase the quality and pertinence of submissions. Other important events in the history of academic journals include the establishment of Nature (1869) and Science (1880), the establishment of Postmodern Culture in 1990 as the first online-only journal, the foundation of arXiv in 1991 for the dissemination of preprints to be discussed prior to publication in a journal, and the establishment of PLOS One in 2006 as the first megajournal.

Scholarly articles
There are two kinds of article or paper submissions in academia: solicited, where an individual has been invited to submit work either through direct contact or through a general submissions call, and unsolicited, where an individual submits a work for potential publication without directly being asked to do so. Upon receipt of a submitted article, editors at the journal determine whether to reject the submission outright or begin the process of peer review. In the latter case, the submission becomes subject to review by outside scholars of the editor's choosing who typically remain anonymous. The number of these peer reviewers (or "referees") varies according to each journal's editorial practice – typically, no fewer than two, though sometimes three or more, experts in the subject matter of the article produce reports upon the content, style, and other factors, which inform the editors' publication decisions. 

Though these reports are generally confidential, some journals and publishers also practice public peer review. The editors either choose to reject the article, ask for a revision and resubmission, or accept the article for publication. Even accepted articles are often subjected to further (sometimes considerable) editing by journal editorial staff before they appear in print. The peer review can take from several weeks to several months.

Reviewing

Review articles

Review articles, also called "reviews of progress", are checks on the research published in journals. Some journals are devoted entirely to review articles, some contain a few in each issue, and others do not publish review articles. Such reviews often cover the research from the preceding year, some for longer or shorter terms; some are devoted to specific topics, some to general surveys. Some reviews are enumerative, listing all significant articles in a given subject; others are selective, including only what they think worthwhile. Yet others are evaluative, judging the state of progress in the subject field. Some journals are published in series, each covering a complete subject field year, or covering specific fields through several years. Unlike original research articles, review articles tend to be solicited or "peer-invited" submissions, often planned years in advance, which may themselves go through a peer-review process once received. They are typically relied upon by students beginning a study in a given field, or for current awareness of those already in the field.

Book reviews

Reviews of scholarly books are checks upon the research books published by scholars; unlike articles, book reviews tend to be solicited. Journals typically have a separate book review editor determining which new books to review and by whom. If an outside scholar accepts the book review editor's request for a book review, he or she generally receives a free copy of the book from the journal in exchange for a timely review. Publishers send books to book review editors in the hope that their books will be reviewed. The length and depth of research book reviews varies much from journal to journal, as does the extent of textbook and trade book review.

Prestige and ranking

An academic journal's prestige is established over time, and can reflect many factors, some but not all of which are expressible quantitatively. In each academic discipline, some journals receive a high number of submissions and opt to restrict how many they publish, keeping the acceptance rate low. Size or prestige are not a guarantee of reliability.

In the natural sciences and in the social sciences, the impact factor is an established proxy, measuring the number of later articles citing articles already published in the journal. There are other quantitative measures of prestige, such as the overall number of citations, how quickly articles are cited, and the average "half-life" of articles. Clarivate Analytics' Journal Citation Reports, which among other features, computes an impact factor for academic journals, draws data for computation from  the Science Citation Index Expanded (for natural science journals), and from the Social Sciences Citation Index (for social science journals). Several other metrics are also used, including the SCImago Journal Rank, CiteScore, Eigenfactor, and Altmetrics.

In the Anglo-American humanities, there is no tradition (as there is in the sciences) of giving impact-factors that could be used in establishing a journal's prestige. Recent moves have been made by the European Science Foundation (ESF) to change the situation, resulting in the publication of preliminary lists for the ranking of academic journals in the humanities. These rankings have been severely criticized, notably by history and sociology of science British journals that have published a common editorial entitled "Journals under Threat". Though it did not prevent ESF and some national organizations from proposing journal rankings, it largely prevented their use as evaluation tools.

In some disciplines such as knowledge management/intellectual capital, the lack of a well-established journal ranking system is perceived by academics as "a major obstacle on the way to tenure, promotion and achievement recognition".  Conversely, a significant number of scientists and organizations consider the pursuit of impact factor calculations as inimical to the goals of science, and have signed the San Francisco Declaration on Research Assessment to limit its use.

The categorization of journal prestige in some subjects has been attempted, typically using letters to rank their academic world importance.

Three categories of techniques have developed to assess journal quality and create journal rankings:
 stated preference;
 revealed preference; and
 publication power approaches

Costs

Many academic journals are subsidized by universities or professional organizations, and do not exist to make a profit. However, they often accept advertising, page and image charges from authors to pay for production costs. On the other hand, some journals are produced by commercial publishers who do make a profit by charging subscriptions to individuals and libraries. They may also sell all of their journals in discipline-specific collections or a variety of other packages.

Journal editors tend to have other professional responsibilities, most often as teaching professors. In the case of the largest journals, there are paid staff assisting in the editing. The production of the journals is almost always done by publisher-paid staff. Humanities and social science academic journals are usually subsidized by universities or professional organization.

The cost and value proposition of subscription to academic journals is being continuously re-assessed by institutions worldwide. In the context of the big deal cancellations by several library systems in the world, data analysis tools like Unpaywall Journals are used by libraries to estimate the specific cost and value of the various options: libraries can avoid subscriptions for materials already served by instant open access via open archives like PubMed Central.

New developments

The Internet has revolutionized the production of, and access to, academic journals, with their contents available online via services subscribed to by academic libraries. Individual articles are subject-indexed in databases such as Google Scholar. Some of the smallest, most specialized journals are prepared in-house, by an academic department, and published only online – such form of publication has sometimes been in the blog format though some, like the open access journal Internet Archaeology, use the medium to embed searchable datasets, 3D models, and interactive mapping. Currently, there is a movement in higher education encouraging open access, either via self archiving, whereby the author deposits a paper in a disciplinary or institutional repository where it can be searched for and read, or via publishing it in a free open access journal, which does not charge for subscriptions, being either subsidized or financed by a publication fee. Given the goal of sharing scientific research to speed advances, open access has affected science journals more than humanities journals. Commercial publishers are experimenting with open access models, but are trying to protect their subscription revenues.

The much lower entry cost of on-line publishing has also raised concerns of an increase in publication of "junk" journals with lower publishing standards. These journals, often with names chosen as similar to well-established publications, solicit articles via e-mail and then charge the author to publish an article, often with no sign of actual review. Jeffrey Beall, a research librarian at the University of Colorado, has compiled a list of what he considers to be "potential, possible, or probable predatory scholarly open-access publishers"; the list numbered over 300 journals as of April 2013, but he estimates that there may be thousands. The OMICS Publishing Group, which publishes a number of the journals on this list, has threatened to sue Beall.

Some academic journals use the registered report format, which aims to counteract issues such as data dredging and hypothesizing after the results are known. For example, Nature Human Behaviour has adopted the registered report format, as it "shift[s] the emphasis from the results of research to the questions that guide the research and the methods used to answer them". The European Journal of Personality defines this format: "In a registered report, authors create a study proposal that includes theoretical and empirical background, research questions/hypotheses, and pilot data (if available). Upon submission, this proposal will then be reviewed prior to data collection, and if accepted, the paper resulting from this peer-reviewed procedure will be published, regardless of the study outcomes."

Electronic journals 

Some journals are born digital, such as the Electronic Journal of Combinatorics, in that they are solely published on the web and in a digital format. Most electronic journals originated as print journals, which subsequently evolved to have an electronic version, while still maintaining a print component, while others eventually become electronic-only.

An e-journal closely resembles a print journal in structure: there is a table of contents which lists the articles, and many electronic journals still use a volume/issue model, although some titles now publish on a continuous basis. Online journal articles are a specialized form of electronic document: they have the purpose of providing material for academic research and study, and they are formatted approximately like journal articles in traditional printed journals. Often a journal article will be available for download in two formats – as a PDF and in HTML format, although other electronic file types are often supported for supplementary material. Articles are indexed in bibliographic databases, as well as by search engines. E-journals allow new types on content to be included in journals, for example video material, or the data sets on which research has been based.

With the growth and development of the Internet, there has been a growth in the number of new journals, especially in those that exist as digital publications only. A subset of these journals exist as Open Access titles, meaning that they are free to access for all, and have Creative Commons licences which permit the reproduction of content in different ways. High quality open access journals are listed in Directory of Open Access Journals. Most however continue to exist as subscription journals, for which libraries, organisations and individuals purchase access.

Lists 

The largest database providing detailed information about journals is Ulrichs Global Serials Directory. Other databases providing detailed information about journals are the Modern Language Association Directory of Periodicals and Genamics JournalSeek. Journal hosting websites like Project MUSE, JSTOR, Pubmed, Ingenta Web of Science, and Informaworld also provide journal lists. Some sites evaluate journals, providing information such as how long a journal takes to review articles and what types of articles it publishes.

See also

Explanatory notes

References

Further reading

External links

 
 ERIH 'Initial' lists, European Science Foundation
 JournalSeek – A Searchable Database of Online Scholarly Journals
 Master Journal List (Thomson Reuters) – a list of selected, and notable academic journals in the arts, humanities, sciences, and social sciences.
 JURN directory of Arts & Humanities ejournals
 Academic Journals: What are They? and Academic Journals Compared to Magazines. Academic Writing. Dennis G. Jerz. Seton Hill University. 2001.
 Peer reviewed articles. San Diego State University.
 Directory of Open Access Journals

 
Academic publishing
Peer review
Scholarly communication